The 1896 United States presidential election in Arkansas took place on November 3, 1896. All contemporary 45 states were part of the 1896 United States presidential election. Arkansas voters chose eight electors to the Electoral College, which selected the president and vice president.

This election marks the establishment of one-party hegemony in every county in Arkansas except Unionist Ozark Newton and Searcy where Republicans would control local government permanently. The new secret ballot and an onerous poll tax had already severely reduced black and poor white voting at the time of this election, in the process largely eliminating opposition party challenges.

Arkansas was won by the Democratic nominees, former U.S. Representative William Jennings Bryan of Nebraska and his running mate Arthur Sewall of Maine. Three electors cast their vice presidential ballots for Thomas E. Watson.

Results

Results by county

See also
 United States presidential elections in Arkansas

Notes

References

Arkansas
1896
1896 Arkansas elections